Parish of the Holiest Saviour, (polish Parafia Najświętszego Zbawiciela we Włocławku), is a Latin Church parish in Włocławek located next to Park Łokietka. Part of Roman Catholic Diocese of Włocławek and subunite of deanery Wloclawek I.

church: Kościół Najświętszego Zbawiciela we Włocławku

Communities 
 OAZA
 Schola
 Ministrant altar boys
 TRIO SALUS" band

History 
Established on April 20, 1958, by intention priest bishop Antoni Pawłowski.

See also 
 World Youth Day 2016
 Church of the Holiest Saviour

References

External links 

 http://www.zbawiciel.wloclawek.pl/
 https://www.youtube.com/watch?v=HCabODsrFzo

Buildings and structures in Włocławek
20th-century Roman Catholic church buildings in Poland